The third season of the American drama/adventure television series Highlander; the season's episodes began airing September 26, 1994 and finished on May 29, 1995. The series follows the adventures of Duncan MacLeod, a 400-year-old Immortal who can only die if he is beheaded; conflict inevitably finds him because he is part of the Game, an ongoing battle in which all Immortals have to fight and behead each other until only one is left.

Cast
 Adrian Paul (Duncan MacLeod)
 Stan Kirsch (Richie Ryan)
 Philip Akin (Charlie DeSalvo) (until ep. 3)
 Lisa Howard (Anne Lindsey) (from ep. 4)
 Jim Byrnes (Joe Dawson)

Recurring cast

 Mark Acheson ... Laszlo
 Amy Adamson ... Margaret of Devon 
 Patrick Albenque ... Genet 
 Michael Anderson Jr. ... Ian Bancroft 
 Charles Andre ... Bellam
 Stefan Arngrim ... Harry
 Terry Arrowsmith ... Haley   
 Cameron Bancroft ... David Keogh
 Linden Banks ... Commander 
 Margaret Barton ... Hag     
 Marc Baur ... Mike / 2 episodes
 Oliver Becker ... Justin 
 Paudge Behan ... Lucas Kagan 
 Lloyd Berry ... Billows
 Claude Berthy ... Father Guillaume 
 George Birt ... Don Salzer
 J.B. Bivens ... George
 Peter Bob ... Kahani 
 Roger Bret ... Father Bernard
 Lynda Boyd ... Karen 
 David Cameron ... Todd Milchan
 Robert Cavanah ... Franklin Waterman 
 Carmen Champlin ... Maria Campolo
 Dolores Chaplin ... Clarise 
 Randall "Tex" Cobb ... Kern
 Jennifer Copping ... Katherine 
 Geraldine Cotte ... Simone Tomas 
 Bill Croft ... Peter Matlin
 Bernard Cuffling ... Harry Wellfleet 
 Roger Daltrey ... Hugh Fitzcairn 
 Alexis Daniel ... Kristov
 Debbie Davis ... Danielle / 2 episodes  
 Edgar Davis Jr. ... Joey
 Anthony De Longis ... Lymon Kurlow  
 Jean Claude Deret ... Georges Dalou
 Laurent Deutsch ... Young Georges 
 Bruce Dinsmore ... Robert Waverly
 Aurelio Dinunzio ... Sal 
 Conrad Dunn ... Matthew
 Myles Ferguson ... Kenny
 Miguel Fernandes ... Paul Karros
 Kelly Fiddick ... Johnny
 Duncan Fraser ... Mr. Renquist 
 Elodie Frenck ... Arianna
 Vicent Gale ... Lattimore
 Thierry Gary ... Iggy
 Matthew Géczy ... Martin / 2 episodes 
 Selina Giles ... Tasha 
 Mykhaël Georges-Schar ... Business Man
 Roland Gift ... Xavier St. Cloud  
 David Gilliam ... Jeremy Clancy
 Alexa Gilmour ... Sharon Collins
 L. Harvey Gold ... Bourchek
 Demetri Goritsas ... Timon
 Tamara Gorski ... Peggy McCall 
 Elizabeth Gracen ... Amanda / 4 episodes
 Jason Gray-Stanford ... Jonah
 David Gregg ... Steven 
 James & Mathew Harrington ... Jeremy
 George Harris ... Vemas
 Laura Harris ... Julia Renquist 
 Pierre Alexis Hollenbeck ... Rudy
 Alf Humphreys ... Frank Brody
 Robert Iseman ... Mike / 3 episodes
 Robert Ito ... Hideo Koto  
 Brion James ... John Durgan
 Georges Janin ... Young Bernard 
 Christina Jastrzembska ... Catherine / 2 episodes
 Willow Johnson ... Miss Welsley
 Hiro Kanagawa ... Akira Yoshida
 Olivier Kandel ... Young Kagan
 Emmanuel Karsen ... Nino / 2 episodes
 Andrew Kavadas ... Anthony Dourcef
 Eric Keenleyside ... Dallman Ross
 Georges Keyl ... Bohdan  
 Liliana Komorowska ... Mara 
 Kim Kondrashoff ... Henry Carter
 Bertrand Lacy ... Doctor Chandon 
 Lorraine Landry ... Maureen
 Ariane Le Roux ... Neva
 Richard Leacock ... Jamal 
 Marc Edouard Leon ... Paolo  
 Terence Leroy-Beaulieu ... Mario  
 Richard Lintern ... Tarsis    
 Eugene Lipinski ... Brother Paul 
 David Longworth ... Father Peter
 Catherine Lough ... Marcia / 3 episodes
 Richard Lynch ... John Kirin
 Charles Maquignon ... Gerard / 2 episodes
 Jean-Charles Maratier ... Angus
 Olivier Marchal ... Philippe 
 F. Braun McAsh ... Derelict
 Stephen McHattie ... Michael Kent
 Adzine Melliti ... Rene
 Frank Messin ... Gaston  
 Vince Metcalfe ... Dan Tarendash
 Anthony Miceli ... Raoul 
 Gabrielle Miller ... Michelle Webster
 Sherry Miller ... Sarah Carter
 Mina E. Mina ... Kahn
 Michel Modo ... Maurice Lalonde / 4 episodes
 Jesse Moss ... Sean Zale 
 John Novak ... Mason
 Jean-François Pages ... Basil Dornin / 2 episodes
 Barry Pepper ... Michael Christian
 Ken Pogue ... Simon Lang
 Rebecca Potok ... Madame Camille
 Justine Priestley ... Lisa Crane    
 Ben Pullen ... Bonnie Prince Charlie    
 John Pyper-Ferguson ... Brian Cullen
 Alfonso Quijada ... Carlos
 Colleen Rennison ... Robin
 David Robb ... Kalas / 5 episodes
 James Rogers ... Cory
 Tony Rosato ... Benny Carbassa
 Gerry Rousseau ... Rafe
 Pierre Rousselle ... Jean
 Karim Salah ... Sultan
 Lyes Salem ... Aram
 Gianfranco Salemi ... Doge
 Ken Samuels ... Roger
 Garwin Sanford ... Garrick
 Alan Scarfe ... Craig Webster
 Jonathan Scarfe ... Allan Kelly 
 Xavier Schliwanski ... Alexei
 Peter Semler ... Callum 
 Olivier Siou ... Laurent 
 Nancy Sivak ... Ginny         
 Nancy Sorel ... Jill Pelentay 
 Stella Stevens ... Margaret Lang 
 Rob Stewart ... Axel Whittaker 
 Marie Stillin ... Nancy Webster
 John Suda ... Hamza El-Kahir 
 Michael Sunczyk ... Syd
 John R. Taylor ... Jake
 John Tench ... Max Jupe
 Didier Terron ... Claude
 Michelle Thrush ... Little Deer
 Tamlyn Tomita ... Midori Koto 
 Barbara Tyson ... Barbara Waverly   
 Kim Johnston Ulrich ... Ceirdwyn 
 Patrice Valota ... Marc Saracen 
 Nick Vrataric ... Tim Parriot 
 Lisa Vultaggio ... Elda
 Sian Webber ... Christine Salzer / 2 episodes
 Chandra West ... Donna
 Andrew Wheeler ... Father Mathew
 Peter Wingfield ... Methos / 3 episodes
 Frederic Witta ... Patrick
 Andrew Woodall ... Ernst Daimler 
 Mary Woronov ... Rita Luce 
 Vivian Wu ... May-Ling Shen 
 Jonathan Zaccai ... Louis
 Valerie Zarrouk ... Naomi

Episodes

Home media

References

External links
Highlander: The Series episode list at Epguides
Highlander: The Series episode list at the Internet Movie Database

3
1994 Canadian television seasons
1995 Canadian television seasons
1994 French television seasons
1995 French television seasons